Urban beekeeping is the practice of keeping bee colonies (hives) in towns and cities. It is also referred to as hobby beekeeping or backyard beekeeping. Bees from city apiaries are said to be "healthier and more productive than their country cousins". As pollinators, bees also provide environmental and economic benefits to cities.

History
Most cities in North America at one time prohibited the keeping of bees, but in recent years beekeepers have had success in overturning these bans. Many urban areas now attempt to regulate the activity; while registering beehives is often mandatory, a high proportion of urban beekeepers do not inform the city. The popularity of urban beekeeping was growing rapidly  perhaps due to its inclusion in the local food movement.  Between 1999 and 2012, London saw a 220% increase in beekeepers.

Challenges and concerns
Swarming is a common occurrence in beekeeping. While harmless, the sight of a swarming colony in urban areas can make people fearful.  Limited resources are another concern for urban beekeeping. As cities have limited greenspaces, the increasing popularity of the hobby may lead to lower honey yields as has been reported in London and New York City. According to a 2015 research study, urban environments have also been shown to favor viability and transmission of some disease agents that affect honey bees.

Urban beekeeping cities
Some cities have active beekeeping communities, while others offer plentiful parks and gardens but have few apiaries.

North America

Detroit 

Detroit is home to a flourishing population of native bees and variety of greenspaces. The city has several urban farms (not all of which maintain hives), including the Michigan Urban Farming Initiative. the Hantz Farm, D-Town Farm, and Earthworks Urban Farms. In 2017, the Detroit Hives nonprofit was founded with the mission to improve communities for people and pollinators, especially for underserved populations, by transforming vacant lots into urban bee farms. Detroit Hives is the first to create an educational apiary in the City of Detroit. In 2019, Detroit Hives founded National Urban Beekeeping Day, celebrated annually on July 19th as a day of education and awareness to support urban beekeepers and the ethical treatment of pollinators living within the urban landscape.

Chicago 
In 2003, Richard M. Daley, then Mayor of Chicago, had two beehives placed atop City Hall. Michael S. Thompson was put in charge of their care. Subsequently, the bee population in the city has grown.

In 2013, a ban on beekeeping was defeated in the suburb of Skokie. The town may regulate backyard beekeeping in the future.

Milwaukee 

In 2010, Milwaukee, Wisconsin, passed a beekeeping ordinance allowing individuals to practice beekeeping in the urban center of the city. Urban beekeepers take part in Milwaukee's Community Pollinator Initiative.

Montreal
Montreal's beehives are regulated by the governmental agency MAPQ. This agency enforces a set of regulations surrounding the installation of a beehive in order to protect the health of colonies, but these rules are rarely restrictive enough to deter committed hobbyists.

The Westmount Library has a public honeybee hive on its roof featuring live inspections every two weeks during the summer months for kids, parents, and the elderly.

As part of their 135th anniversary, Birks Group installed three honeybee hives on the roof of their downtown headquarters.

In the summer of 2014, the Accueil Bonneau homeless facility launched a pilot project introducing their itinerant community to the art of beekeeping as a means of re-engaging them in a fulfilling and meaningful hobby.

Most of the public beekeeping initiatives stem from companies offering beekeeping services that make it more accessible to urban dwellers, such as Alveole, Apiguru, or Miel Montreal. The movement towards generating local produce is part of the reason beekeeping is becoming increasingly popular in this metropolitan city.

New York
Until 2010, beekeeping was illegal in New York City, but this had little effect on the many New Yorkers who built and maintained hives. Prior to being recognized by the city, urban beekeeping had become an established hobby, and a support network of organizations, blogs, and supply stores were already in place. When the ban was lifted, only the non-aggressive Apis Mellifera species was allowed to be kept. While registering beehives is required, as of 2012 only half of the 400 bee colonies thought to be situated on New York rooftops had been reported to the city.

In New York, there are beehives at InterContinental The Barclay Hotel, the Waldorf-Astoria Hotel, the York Prep School, the Brooklyn Navy Yard, and the Bank of America Tower (New York City).

Toronto
Hives have been kept discreetly in Toronto for many years. Several beekeepers kept around fifty hives each along the Don River in the beginning of the 20th century. There was also a beekeeping co-op near the Don Valley Brick Works into the late 1950s. Mayor William Dennison kept nineteen colonies in his Jarvis Street backyard during the 1970s. During this time, beekeeping equipment could be bought in the downtown Little Italy  and Little Portugal neighbourhoods

As of 2015, Toronto does not have any bylaws governing beekeeping, so the Ontario Bees Act applies. The Act does not address urban beekeeping but contains a  set back requirement for property lines, and a  set back requirement for highways. However, the rule has gone largely unenforced as few urban lots are spacious enough to meet requirements concerning proximity to property lines, dwellings, and highways. In 2011, there were 107 registered hives in Toronto.

Some of the many Toronto landmarks that host honey bee hives include: the Fort York historic site, the Four Seasons Centre for the Performing Arts rooftop, the University of Toronto, the Amsterdam Brewing Company rooftop, and the Fairmont Royal York hotel.

Vancouver
Often regarded as a green and sustainable city, the City of Vancouver has recognized hobby beekeeping in residential areas by issuing guidelines and requiring hives to be registered. Bees are kept at Vancouver Convention Centre and Vancouver City Hall.

Los Angeles 
Los Angeles has a long history of beekeeping. The first two honey bee colonies arrived in California by way of the Isthmus of Panama, in 1853. Imported by Christopher H. Shelton, they were the only survivors of the long trip from New York to San Francisco. Bees were purchased on the docks of San Francisco for $150 then brought south to Los Angeles. The bees arrived in Los Angeles on September 4, 1854. In April 1855, the colonies cast out two swarms which were sold for another $150. At this time, the honey generated by the bees was sold for $1.50 per pound. Italian bees ("Apis mellifera ligustica"), considered superior to the German variety ("Apis mellifera mellifera"), were introduced in January 1855.

By the 1860s, beekeeping was common in Los Angeles with some individuals owning 25 hives. Wild honey was collected in significant quantities throughout the foothills. The honey was sent to San Francisco for sale. A large colony was found in the San Fernando Valley, some estimate it contained 8 to 10 tons of honey:The hive is located in a rift which penetrates the rock to a depth of approximately 160 feet. The orifice is 30 feet long and 17 feet wide with four passages. This rift was discovered to be the nesting place of a swarm of bees that was seen to come out in a nearly solid column, one foot in diameter. Certain parties have endeavored to descend to the immense store of honey collected by the bees, but were invariably driven back, and one man lost his life in the effort.

In 1873, the Los Angeles County Beekeepers Association was founded. In 1879, Los Angeles lawmakers banned beekeeping within city limits based on the false belief that honey bees damaged the citrus crop (one of the largest industries in the Los Angeles area). By 1917, there were calls to repeal the "ancient ordinance"; many were illegally keeping hives anyway, but lawmakers did not act. It was not until 2015 that the 136 year old ordinance was repealed by the city council.

Kansas City (Kansas) 

Kansas City and its surrounding suburban areas are home to a number of urban apiaries and backyard beekeepers. While many cities and towns have specific ordinances regarding the practice of keeping bees, the Wyandotte County (Kansas City, Kansas) municipal code makes no mention of honey bees, beekeeping, bee hives, or any related terminology.

Hobbyists often learn best from one another's experiences in the field, and Kansas City has a robust community of urban beekeepers who communicate, educate, and gather with one another throughout the year. The Northeastern Kansas Beekeeping Association is one such organization whose territory includes Kansas City, Kansas. Johnson County, which is considered a part of the Kansas City metro area, is home to a growing number of suburban cities allowing their residents to keep bees within city limits.

Europe

London
Beekeeping in London has become increasingly popular. The number of beekeepers rose 220% between 1999 and 2012 with other figures showing a 200% increase between 2008 and 2013. As of 2012, an estimated 3,200 apiaries exist in London. While registration is mandatory, 75% are thought to operate without a license. The density of hives in London is much greater than in other areas of the UK, and this has led to concerns that city green spaces may not provide sufficient forage to sustain growing bee populations.

The UK government has aided the rise of beekeeping in cities by releasing a plastic beehive purpose-built for urban beekeeping. Called Beehaus, it is supported by quango Natural England. Organizations supporting urban beekeeping in London include The London Beekeeper's Association, which holds monthly meetings, provides mentoring to new beekeepers, and lends out beekeeping supplies.

Bees are kept at significant locations such as the department store Fortnum & Mason, Lambeth Palace, Buckingham Palace, the London Stock Exchange, the Natural History Museum, the Tate Modern, and at the Royal Lancaster Hotel. Hives once stood atop the Bank of England.

Istanbul 
Urban beekeeping is a growing hobby and industry in Istanbul. Beehives can be found from city parks to high rise building terraces. Beekeeping in the city, especially in its outer districts, is supported by the municipal government, İBB. Hotels like The Ritz-Carlton in Istanbul also reportedly have urban beehives for their restaurant's honey needs. Urban beekeeping has been described as difficult hobby in İstanbul, which has fewer green spaces compared to other cities in Turkey. Unregistered beehives can be spotted in some parks in downtown districts of İstanbul.

Hasan Efe from the Apiculture Research Institute stated that beekeeping in İstanbul's city center could harm the insects’ physiology, adding that gas from vehicles and environmental conditions can contaminate urban honey with heavy metals. These claims were challenged by some research centers that did not find significantly elevated levels of heavy metals in urban honey samples.

Local and international conferences and seminars about urban beekeeping are being held in the city. İstanbul has also hosted the 45th edition of Apimondia, the International Federation of Beekeepers' Associations, in 2017 and again in 2022.

Africa

Johannesburg 
Johannesburg has over six million trees.  This environment is ideal for urban beekeepers, who often have higher honey yields per hive than other Highveld beekeepers.  In South Africa, anyone who handles bees must be registered as a beekeeper with the Department of Agriculture, Forestry and Fisheries.

Other cities
Urban beekeeping exists in many major cities and has been reported in: Berlin, Hamburg, Hong Kong, Bengaluru (Bangalore), Melbourne, Sydney, and Tokyo.

See also
I Have a Bee

References

Beekeeping
Culture of New York City
Culture in London
Urban agriculture
Localism (politics)
Sustainable food system

de:Imker#Stadtimkerei